Carlos Hernán Andica (born November 12, 1983 in Armenia, Quindío) is a Colombian weightlifter. Andica was initially trained by Alfonso Gallego. Andica won a silver medal for the 85 kg class at the 2011 Pan American Games in Guadalajara, Mexico, with a total of 362 kilograms.

Andica made his official debut for the 2004 Summer Olympics in Athens, where he competed for the men's middleweight class (77 kg). He finished only in eighteenth place by five kilograms short of the record from Egypt's Mohamed El-Tantawy, with a total of 322.5 kg (142.5 in the snatch and 180 in the clean and jerk).

At the 2008 Summer Olympics in Beijing, Andica switched to a heavier class by competing in the light heavyweight class (85 kg). Andica placed eight  in this event, as he successfully lifted 155 kg in the single-motion snatch, and hoisted 201 kg in the two-part, shoulder-to-overhead clean and jerk, for a total of 356 kg.

References

External links
Profile – Lift Up
NBC Olympics Profile

Colombian male weightlifters
1983 births
Living people
Olympic weightlifters of Colombia
Weightlifters at the 2004 Summer Olympics
Weightlifters at the 2008 Summer Olympics
Weightlifters at the 2007 Pan American Games
Pan American Games silver medalists for Colombia
People from Quindío Department
People from Armenia, Colombia
Pan American Games medalists in weightlifting
Medalists at the 2011 Pan American Games
21st-century Colombian people